Drusus may refer to:

 Claudius (Tiberius Claudius Drusus) (10 BC–AD 54), Roman emperor from 41 to 54
 Drusus Caesar (AD 8–33), adoptive grandson of Roman emperor Tiberius
 Drusus Julius Caesar (14 BC–AD 23), son of Roman emperor Tiberius
 Gaius Livius Drusus (jurist), Roman jurist, son of the consul
 Marcus Livius Drusus (consul) (155–108 BC), Roman senator, opponent of populist reformer Gaius Gracchus
 Marcus Livius Drusus (reformer) (died 91 BC)
 Nero Claudius Drusus (38–9 BC), brother of Roman emperor Tiberius
 Tiberius Claudius Drusus (circa AD 10–20), son of Roman emperor Claudius

See also

 
 Livii Drusi